St Joseph's College is a boys' secondary school and sixth form with academy status, located in the Upper Norwood area of the London Borough of Croydon, England. The school is a single sex educational establishment for boys up to the age of 16 and operates a co-educational sixth-form for boys and girls aged 16 to 18.

History
The school trustees are the De La Salle Brothers. The College was founded in 1855 and was located on High Street in Clapham between 1855 and 1888. The school has been on its present site in Beulah Hill since 1904. The De La Salle brothers were all poor from the help of John Baptist De La Salle they built a similar school for boys because there was already a similar school for girls  and they named it after St Joseph.

Construction
The oldest part of the school is the Grecian Villa which predates the school.  The current Hall and Science Block was constructed in 1964, followed by a Design and Technology department in 1975, which has since been refurbished. The school features a newly built History block which includes four Classrooms and an office. It has been a voluntary aided school as of 1973. In 2003, it became a Mathematics and Computing specialist school.

Other
In 2011, Headmaster Eamon Connolly retired, and was succeeded by Marco Franchetti who after his retirement was replaced in January 2016 by David Garrido, then later succeeded by Catherine Kane, in September 2021 making her the first female Headteacher in the College’s 168 year history. In 2016, a local internet company, Limetree, decided to sponsor the senior school football team at the school.

Facilities
7 ICT Suites including the Cisco Academy Suite.
Newly refurbished Learning Resource Centre has replaced the degraded library.
A swimming pool and a well conditioned sports hall.
New Apple Mac Music Studio.
Major refurbishment of many classrooms for the 2010/11 school year.

Famous former pupils
 Andrew Grima (1921–2007), British jewellery designer.
 Roddy McDowall (1928–1998), British and American radio, stage, film, and television actor, director and photographer.
 Dickie Henderson (1922–1985), British comedian, dancer and entertainer.
 Francis George Kenna Gallagher (1917–2011), British Foreign Office official and diplomat.
 Ted Clark, cricketer for Middlesex C.C.C.
 Martin Long, founder of Churchill Insurance Company, co-owner of Crystal Palace F.C..
 Myles Kenlock, footballer for Ipswich Town Football Club.
 Fankaty Dabo, footballer for Coventry City Football Club.
 Peter Ventress, Non-executive chairman of Galliford Try.
 Nick Bright, radio and television presenter for BBC Radio 1Xtra & BBC Sport.
 Bernard Skinner, author of an epoch-making book on British moths.

References

Bibliography

External links
Official website
Old Josephinians website
History (from Old Josephinians website)
St Joseph's College 1855-2005
croydon.gov.uk

Boys' schools in London
Croydon
Catholic secondary schools in the Archdiocese of Southwark
Educational institutions established in 1855
Secondary schools in the London Borough of Croydon
1855 establishments in England
Academies in the London Borough of Croydon